Union for Progress may refer to:

Union for Progress (Congo), a political party in the Republic of the Congo
Union for Progress (Saint Martin), a political party in Saint Martin
Union for Progress and Renewal (Guinea), a political party in Guinea
Union for the Progress of Guinea, a political party in Guinea
Union for Progress (Andorra), a political party in Andorra